Richard Kay was an American film producer who also did some acting and is credited with directing one film.

He produced The Golden Mistress, Godzilla, King of the Monsters!, Untamed Women and Wild Weed. He was production supervisor on Angel Baby in 1961.

Credits

As an actor 

 Three Sisters, 1970.
 Wuthering Heights, 1978.
 Deja Vu, 1985.

As a director 

 International Burlesque, 1950.

As a producer 

 She Shoulda Said No!, 1949.
 Riders of the Pony Express, 1949.
 Wild Weed, 1949.
 International Burlesque, 1950.
 Untamed Women, 1952.
 The Golden Mistress, 1954.
 Curucu, Beast of the Amazon, 1956.
 Godzilla, King of the Monsters!, 1956.
 Girls on the Loose, 1958.
 Live Fast, Die Young, 1958.

As a production manager 
Riders of the Pony Express, 1949.

Angel Baby, 1961.

References

External links

Year of birth missing
Year of death missing
American film producers